This is a list of lighthouses in Belize. They are mostly located on the islands of the eastern Caribbean coastline of the country.

Lighthouses

See also
 Transport in Belize
 Lists of lighthouses and lightvessels

References

External links

 

Belize
Lighthouse
Lighthouses